Kathryn Robinson may refer to:

 Kathryn Robinson (equestrian) (born 1985), Canadian eventing athlete 
 Kathryn Robinson (journalist) (born 1975), Australian television presenter and journalist 
 Kathryn Dee Robinson, American ambassador to Ghana